Andrew Davies (born 1 February 1981) is a Welsh jazz trumpet player. At the London Jazz Festival, 2007, he played the role of Chet Baker in the play, "Speedball".

According to Dave Gelly of The Observer, "Andy Davies has a lovely trumpet sound, and in the totally acoustic setting of a small club, it blossoms.". In addition to his musical talents, Davies also provides continuity announcements on digital television channel 5* (previously Fiver) along with Cartoon Network & ITV.

References

External links
Official website

1981 births
Welsh jazz musicians
British jazz trumpeters
Male trumpeters
Living people
21st-century trumpeters
21st-century British male musicians
British male jazz musicians